Lobera or La Lobera is the Spanish word for "wolves' lair", “wolf trap”, "wolf pack" or "wolf woman." It is equivalent to Portuguese Lobeira and Italian Luparia.

It may refer to:

Places
 Lobera de Onsella
 Lobera de la Vega
 Lobera de Orense
 Cave on San Pedro Nolasco Island
 "Wolf's Lair," or La Lobera, isolation blockhouse in Callao Naval Base prison in Peru housing inmates such as Shining Path terrorist leader Abimael Guzman.

People
 Lobera, a common Spanish surname
 Pedro Mariño de Lobera
 Ana María García, la Lobera, who appeared before the Inquisition of Toledo in 1648 accused of controlling seven demonic wolves

Other
 a wolf trap, funnel-like walls leading to a pit with stakes for hunting wolves in Spain
 Wolf-slayer Lobera (sword)
 Digitalis purpurea
 Wolf apple Solanum lycocarpum common in the Brazilian savanna.